Outagamie County  is a county in the northeast region of the U.S. state of Wisconsin. As of the 2020 census, the population was 190,705. Its county seat is Appleton.

Outagamie County is included in the Appleton, WI Metropolitan Statistical Area, which is also included in the Appleton-Neenah-Oshkosh, WI Combined Statistical Area. It was named for the historic Meskwaki (Fox) Indians.

History
"Outagamie," a French transliteration of the Anishinaabe term for the Meskwaki (Fox) Indians, meant "dwellers of other shore" or "dwellers on the other side of the stream," referring to their historic habitation along the St. Lawrence River and south of the Great Lakes. They had occupied considerable territory in Wisconsin prior to colonization. Outagamie County was created in 1851 and organized in 1852.

Geography

Adjacent counties
 Shawano County - north
 Brown County - east
 Calumet County - southeast
 Winnebago County - southwest
 Waupaca County - west

Rivers
 Wolf River - The Wolf River runs through the city of New London and the village of Shiocton along western half of the county.
 Fox River - The Fox River follows the south-eastern corner of the county, running through the cities of Appleton and Kaukauna
 Shioc River - This river runs merges with the Wolf River in the village of Shiocton.
 Embarrass River - The Embarrass River runs through the city of New London and merges with the Wolf River there.

Lakes
 Black Otter Lake - Located in Hortonville, it receives much recreational use by anglers for being the only lake within the county.

Government
Outagamie County's government consists of an elected County Board of Supervisors, a County Executive, and 36 county agencies and departments.

County Executive
The county executive serves as its chief executive officer, participating in the legislative process with the County Board of Supervisors and exercising administrative authority and control over the county's operations, departments, offices, boards, programs, and communications.

Department heads are appointed by the county executive, subject to the approval of the board of supervisors. The county executive also appoints members to the county's boards and commissions. The county executive sets the annual budget in consultation with and subject to the approval of the board of supervisors.

County Executive Tom Nelson was first elected in 2011.

Transportation

Major Highways

  Interstate 41
  U.S. Highway 41
  U.S. Highway 45
  Wisconsin Highway 15
  Wisconsin Highway 29
  Wisconsin Highway 32
  Wisconsin Highway 47
  Wisconsin Highway 54
  Wisconsin Highway 55
  Wisconsin Highway 76
  Wisconsin Highway 96
  Wisconsin Highway 125
  Wisconsin Highway 187
  Wisconsin Highway 441

County Highways

  County A
  County AA
  County B
  County BB
  County C
  County CA
  County CB
  County CC
  County CE
  County D
  County DD
  County E
  County EE
  County F
  County FF
  County G
  County GG
  County GV
  County H
  County HH
  County I
  County J
  County JJ
  County K
  County KK
  County M
  County MM
  County N
 County NC
  County O
  County OO
  County P
  County PP
  County Q
  County S
  County T
  County TT
  County U
  County UU
  County VV
  County W
  County WW
  County X
  County XX
  County Y
  County Z
  County ZZ

Railroads
Canadian National
Watco

Buses
Valley Transit (Wisconsin)
List of intercity bus stops in Wisconsin

Airports
 Appleton International Airport (KATW) serves the county and surrounding communities. It is the third busiest airport in Wisconsin and is served by 4 airlines to 16 destinations.
 Shiocton Airport (W34) is a grass strip airport located in Shiocton, Wisconsin

Demographics

2020 census
As of the census of 2020, the population was 190,705. The racial makeup of the county was 86.0% White, 3.5% Asian, 1.6% Native American, 1.6% Black or African American, 0.1% Pacific Islander, 2.0% from other races, and 5.3% from two or more races. Ethnically, the population was 4.9% Hispanic or Latino of any race.

2000 census
As of the census of 2000, there were 160,971 people, 60,530 households, and 42,189 families residing in the county. The racial makeup of the county was 93.87% White, 0.54% Black or African American, 1.54% Native American, 2.23% Asian, 0.03% Pacific Islander, 0.81% from other races, and 0.98% from two or more races. 1.99% of the population were Hispanic or Latino of any race. 47.7% were of German, 9.4% Dutch, 6.2% Irish and 5.2% American and French-Canadian ancestry.

Of the 60,530 households, 36.00% had children under the age of 18 living with them, 58.90% were married couples living together, 7.60% had a female householder with no husband present, and 30.30% were non-families. 24.20% of all households were made up of individuals, and 8.40% had someone living alone who was 65 years of age or older. The average household size was 2.61 and the average family size was 3.14.

By age, 27.70% of the population was under 18, 8.90% from 18 to 24, 31.90% from 25 to 44, 20.70% from 45 to 64, and 10.90% were 65 or older. The median age was 34 years. For every 100 females there were 99.50 males. For every 100 females age 18 and over, there were 96.90 males.

In 2017, there were 2,204 births, giving a general fertility rate of 64.0 births per 1000 women aged 15–44, the 34th highest rate out of all 72 Wisconsin counties. Additionally, there were 136 reported induced abortions performed on women of Outagamie County residence in 2017.

Communities

Cities
 Appleton (county seat; partly in Calumet County and Winnebago County)
 Kaukauna (partially in Calumet County)
 New London (mostly in Waupaca County)
 Seymour

Villages

 Bear Creek
 Black Creek
 Combined Locks
 Greenville
 Harrison (mostly in Calumet County)
 Hortonville
 Howard (mostly in Brown County)
 Kimberly
 Little Chute
 Nichols
 Shiocton
 Wrightstown (mostly in Brown County)

Towns

 Black Creek
 Bovina
 Buchanan
 Center
 Cicero
 Dale
 Deer Creek
 Ellington
 Freedom
 Grand Chute
 Hortonia
 Kaukauna
 Liberty
 Maine
 Maple Creek
 Oneida
 Osborn
 Seymour
 Vandenbroek

Census-designated place
 Dale

Unincorporated communities

 Apple Creek
 Binghamton
 Center Valley
 Chicago Corners
 Cicero
 Darboy
 Five Corners
 Freedom
 Greenville
 Hamples Corner
 Isaar
 Leeman
 Mackville
 Medina
 Murphy Corner
 Oneida
 Sniderville (partial)
 Stephensville
 Sugar Bush
 Twelve Corners

Ghost towns/neighborhoods
 Grand Chute
 Lawesburg
 Lime Rock
 Wakefield

Native American community
 Oneida Nation of Wisconsin (partial)

Politics
Outagamie County has voted for the Republican presidential candidate in seventeen of the last twenty presidential elections.

See also
 National Register of Historic Places listings in Outagamie County, Wisconsin

References

Further reading
 Commemorative Biographical Record of the Fox River Valley Counties of Brown, Outagamie and Winnebago. Chicago: J. H. Beers, 1895.
 Ryan, Thomas H. (ed.). History of Outagamie County Wisconsin. Chicago: Goodspeed Historical Association, 1911.

External links
 Outagamie County government
 Outagamie County map from the Wisconsin Department of Transportation
 Outagamie County entry on Wisconsin Online

 
1852 establishments in Wisconsin
Populated places established in 1852
Wisconsin placenames of Native American origin